Grian or Greaney is the name of a river, a lake, and  region in the portion of the Sliabh Aughty mountains in County Clare. It formed part of the boundary of the kingdom of Síol Anmchadha.

Grian (literally, "Sun") is also the name of an Irish figure, presumed to be a pre-Christian goddess, associated with County Limerick and Cnoc Greine ("Hill of Grian, Hill of the sun"), located seven miles from Knockainey.

While Grian's name literally means "the sun" in modern Irish, her name is derived from the Proto-Indo European word *gwher-, meaning "to be hot" or "to burn" rather than the derivations for sun in other Indo-European languages.

See also
 Deò-ghrèine
 Gráinne (given name)
 Tuamgraney

References

Geography of County Clare

th:โทรล
th:เกรียน